The 2013 FIA Junior World Rally Championship was the twelfth season of the Junior World Rally Championship, an auto racing championship recognised by the Fédération Internationale de l'Automobile, running in support of the World Rally Championship. It was previously known as the WRC Academy.

The Junior World Rally Championship was open to drivers under the age of twenty-six. All teams contested the same six events – with their best five results counting towards their final championship position – in identical Ford Fiesta R2 cars, prepared by M-Sport. Hankook supplied tyres for all competitors.

Pontus Tidemand secured the drivers' championship after winning at the Rallye de France-Alsace.

Calendar

The calendar for the 2013 Junior World Rally Championship consisted of six rounds, run alongside the World Rally Championship.

Teams and drivers

The following teams and drivers took part in the 2013 Junior World Rally Championship season:

Rally summaries

Championship standings

Points are awarded to the top 10 classified finishers, and one point for winning a stage. Five best results of the season are counted towards the final score.

Drivers' championship

Notes
 1 refers to the number of stages won, where a bonus point is awarded per stage win.
 † Driver withdrew from the event, and was excluded from the championship.

Co-drivers' championship

Notes
 1 refers to the number of stages won, where a bonus point is awarded per stage win.

References

External links
Official website of the World Rally Championship

Junior World Rally Championship